Man Yue Technology Holdings Limited is a Chinese manufacturer of capacitors, founded in 1979 and listed in the Hong Kong Stock Exchange since 1997.

It markets its products under different brands, including SAMXON, X-CON, XLPC, and ANGA POW.

References

Manufacturing companies based in Shenzhen
Electronics companies of Hong Kong
Capacitor manufacturers
Chinese brands